Loreburn may refer to:

Loreburn, Newfoundland and Labrador, Canada
Loreburn, Saskatchewan, Canada
Rural Municipality of Loreburn No. 254
Robert Reid, 1st Earl Loreburn

See also
Loreburn Hall
Loreburn Report